Lara State is one of the 23 states of Venezuela. Lara is located in the Central-Western Region, Venezuela. The state capital is Barquisimeto. 

Toponymy
The state is named after a notable hero of Venezuela's independence, General Jacinto Lara.

History

During the colony and a large part of the independence period, the current territory of Lara belonged to the province of Caracas. In 1824 it was absorbed by the Province of Carabobo, created that year. In 1832, after the disintegration of the Great Colombia, the region was disintegrated; it was then constituted in the Province of Barquisimeto, which included the cantons of Quíbor, El Tocuyo, Carora and Barquisimeto; besides others that conform today the state of Yaracuy. In 1856, through the new law of territorial division, San Felipe and Yaritagua joined Nirgua to form the Province of Yaracuy. It is in these towns, mainly in El Tocuyo and Barquisimeto, where the first lights of Venezuelan Independence were documented, and from which the construction of Venezuela was undertaken with the towns, cities and roads that unite the great part of this territory. It is also worth noting that the cattle that were taken to the Llanos were the Tocuyo cattle.

In 1881, the creation of the Great State of the North of the West was agreed upon, to which the areas of Lara and Yaracuy were added. In August of that same year, the state was given the name Lara, in honor of the patriot General Jacinto Lara. In 1899, the Congress established the autonomy of the 20 states, as contemplated in the 1864 constitution, a division that was confirmed in 1909, through a constitutional reform, which has been maintained until today.

In 1899, the territory corresponding to the current municipalities Silva and Monseñor Iturriza of the state of Falcon were integrated into the latter state in exchange for what today is the municipality Urdaneta.

Prehistory

When the Europeans arrived in Venezuela, the region that is now Lara was inhabited by various ethnic groups such as the gayones, ayomanes and coyones. These peoples spoke, according to what anthropologists have been able to reconstruct from Spanish sources, languages of the Jirajarana linguistic family. The valleys of Quíbor, Barquisimeto and El Tocuyo had a relatively high population density and the peoples of the region practiced agriculture.

Spanish Conquest and Colonization
The Augsburg Welser expeditions were very destructive for the region. From 1529 to the 1940s the German conquerors carried out massacres of entire villages and tried to enslave the remaining indigenous people. Several of the first permanent populations of Europeans settled here because of the fertility of the region and the availability of indigenous labour. Thus, towns such as El Tocuyo, Quíbor, Cuara and Cubiro were founded.

The Welser administration was in permanent conflict with the interests of the Spaniards, who accused them of failing to carry out the task of colonization, among other things. In 1545, Juan de Carvajal, who lived in Coro, went with several families of colonists to the area of El Tocuyo and there he began to distribute the natives according to the encomienda system. El Tocuyo became one of the most important axes of the Venezuelan economy and also the center of operations of the Spanish conquest in the territory.

During the colony, the current Lara territory belonged to the province of Caracas. The region of El Tocuyo and Barquisimeto had convents that offered education to the inhabitants at a higher level than in other regions of Venezuela.

In the 17th century El Tocuyo developed a school of painting that was in contact with that of Quito. By the 18th century the area of Lara was an important producer of wheat, which was exported to Mexico.

Independent Venezuela

In 1824 it was absorbed by the Province of Carabobo, created that year. In 1832, after the disintegration of Gran Colombia, the region was disbanded; it was then constituted in the Province of Barquisimeto, which included the cantons of Quíbor, El Tocuyo, Carora and Barquisimeto; in addition to others that today make up the state of Yaracuy. In 1856, through the new law of territorial division, San Felipe and Yaritagua joined Nirgua to form the Province of Yaracuy. In 1881, it was agreed to create the Great State of the North of the West, to which the areas of Lara and Yaracuy were added. In August of that same year the name of Lara State was assigned in honor of the patriot General Jacinto Lara. In 1899,12 the Congress established the autonomy of the 20 states, as contemplated in the 1864 constitution, a division that was confirmed in 1909, through a constitutional reform, which has been maintained until today.

Until 1899 this state had access to the sea with the populations of Tucacas and Chichiriviche, currently belonging to the state of Falcon. In fact, the population of Tucacas was the main port of export of copper extracted from the mines of Aroa.

Geography

It is bordered on the north by Falcon State; on the south by Portuguesa and Trujillo States; on the east by Yaracuy State and on the west by Zulia State.

This state has 19,800 square kilometers (19,800 square miles) which represents 2.15% of the national territory, a territory almost equivalent to the size of Israel.

Hydrography

Typical dry and arid landscape of the state in the area of Cerro Saroche National Park.
The waters of the state's rivers flow from three different sources: the Caribbean, the Atlantic through the Orinoco River and Lake Maracaibo.

Main rivers: Amarillo, Auro, Aragua, Curarigua, Morere, Tocuyo, Turbio, Urama, Yacambú.
Lagoons: Laguna Amarilla, Laguna Cocoy.
Wine Waterfall in Dinira National Park

Relief
Lara's topography consist of high plains and low, broken hills, with a relatively hot and dry climate. Lara depression is located at altitudes between 1,600 and 2,600 ft (487 to 792 m). Among the landscapes of moderate height, the pressures of Carora, Barquisimeto and Yaracuy stand out, while the Sierra de Aroa, the Nirgua Massif and the Andean buttress present more broken reliefs. The Barquisimeto high plateau is a privileged place for human settlement, commerce and communications, while the valley of the turbid river allows for intense agricultural use, in contrast to the aridity of the surrounding xerophytic vegetation. It is integrated by the last foothills of the Venezuelan Andes System, located in the south and southwest of the state respectively. The most pronounced altitude in the state is the Cendé Paramo at 3,585 m above sea level.

The Lara-Falcón formation is, from the orographic point of view, the transition between the Coastal and the Andean mountain ranges. It is a different system in which the Coriano system, the Barquisimeto-Carora depression and the Turbio-Yaracuy depression stand out. This depression is located in the northwest of the country, with an approximate extension of 52,000 square kilometers.

Vegetation
It is as varied as its relief and climate, although in almost all the territory xerophilous vegetation predominates, represented by cujíes, tunas, espinares and cardonales.

To the south the variety ranges from scrub and bushes to evergreen forests, with woods in mountainous areas. Different plant formations are identified as a result of the combination of the different environmental variables within a tropical space. To the west, in the Carora depression, the forest community is poor with a predominance of sparse and xerophytic thorn trees. In the eastern sector there are deciduous or semi-deciduous primary forests. The cujíes and cardones dominate the central and northern areas, while towards the south and in the mountainous areas the vegetation cover goes from the bushes to the semi-humid forests. The fertility of some valleys allows the cultivation of sugar cane, sisal and fruits.

Geology
It presents from mountain areas with geological components of the secondary and tertiary era to extensive plains formed by large alluvial contributions of the Quaternary era, through valley landscapes, formed by sediments of Quaternary origin.

Climate 
Two types of climate prevail in Lara state: Tropical, Mountain,  and also dry and very dry, followed by wet mountain. Mountain humid climates are low and humid paramero just 4.8% of estadal area. The dry atmosphere is typical, since evaporation exceeds precipitation, reaching until 650 mm of annual average, with rain falling at different times according to geographycal location..

The average annual temperature fluctuates between 19 °C (66,2 °F)  and 29 °C (84,2 °F), with an average of 24 °C (75,2 °F) in the capital, Barquisimeto.

The climate tends to vary between cold moor (in mountainous areas) and semi-arid tropical dry climate (specific in the area of the Lara's Depression, where the city of Carora and surrounding populations are located).

In general, the climate tends to vary between cold moorland (in the mountainous areas) and dry semi-arid tropical climate (mainly in the area of the Larense Depression where the city of Carora and surrounding towns are located).

The tropical steppe climate (semi-arid) is located specifically towards the northern part of the states of Zulia and Falcón, the Lara-Falcón depression, the central coastal zone, the coastal areas of the Unare depression and part of the state of Sucre, towards the Gulf of Cariaco, and a large part of the island of Margarita.

Soils
About 60% of the land in the west of Lara State is mountainous and presents soils of slow permeability, fine texture, reddish color and commonly acid reaction. They have a low organic matter content and low fertility.

To the southeast of Carora the soils are stony, without a well developed profile, variable permeability, acid reaction, fast runoff and strong erosion. In the area corresponding to the beaches the low permeability, the flooding, the predominant clayey texture and the appreciable content of salts limit their use. Erosion is present throughout the area and the hills near the beaches present a critical physiognomy. In the Barquisimeto Depression, the soils of the flat areas are very variable.

Hydrography 
The waters of the rivers in the state are drained by three aspects:. The Caribbean sea, the Atlantic Ocean,  through the Orinoco River and Maracaibo's Lake.

Main rivers: Amarillo, Auro, Aragua, Curarigua, Morere, Tocuyo, Turbio, Urama, Yacambú.

Lagoons: Laguna Amarilla, Laguna Cocoy. Wine waterfall in the Dinira National Park

Politics and Government
As a state it is autonomous and equal in political terms to its peers, it organizes its administration and public powers through a Constitution of the Lara State, dictated by the Legislative Council.

Like the other 23 federal entities of Venezuela, the State maintains its own police force, which is supported and complemented by the National Police and the Venezuelan National Guard.

Executive Power
It is composed by the Governor of Lara State and a group of State Secretaries of his confidence who are officials of free appointment and removal. The Governor is elected by the people through direct, universal and secret vote for a period of four years and with the possibility of continuous re-election for new periods, being in charge of the state administration. The Governor must render an annual account of his actions before the regional parliament called the Legislative Council of Lara State.

The current governor is Adolfo Pereira Antique of the PSUV. He succeeded Carmen Meléndez, who elected for the 2017–2021 term.

Legislative Branch
The state legislature is the responsibility of the Legislative Council of Lara State, a unicameral parliament elected by the people through direct, universal and secret vote every four years. The legislature can be reelected for consecutive periods, under a system of proportional representation of the population of the state and its municipalities. Its headquarters are located in the Legislative Palace of Lara State, in the city of Barquisimeto.

In the elections held on December 16, 2012, to elect governor and deputies, the ruling party obtained the majority of seats

PSUV: 9 Legislators (7 nominal and 2 list vote)
MUD: 6 Legislators (6 nominal and 1 ready vote)
In this way the PSUV obtains a majority and controls the Lara Legislative Council.

Demography

Race and ethnicity 

According to the 2011 Census, the racial composition of the population was: 1.774.867

Municipalities and municipal seats

Economy 

The cultivation of sugarcane has become one of the leading and first sugar states. Also, products like coffee, potatoes, tomatoes, beans, corn, and banana . Its grape cultivation is associated with the wine industry. Has an important livestock of cattle, pigs, goats, sheep, and poultry with good cheese and dairy industry. It also has important industrial areas and production capacity. It has great artisan wealth and potential tourism development, natural beauties, and folkloric and cultural events.

Among the most important industries in the state of Lara are the metalworking (Turbio's steel industry, SIDETUR; food processing, clothing apparel, textile printing and processing (based sisal fiber) sector. The most manufacturing are in the small and medium industry because, except for its sugar mills, Almost all its industrial park consists of companies of less than two hundred workers.

More than 50% of the population is concentrated in the capital (Barquisimeto) where the main commercial, financial and industrial activities are located. Despite the dynamism that has reached, places the entity as one of the most important recipients of migratory flows in the country, which has also reached urban centers such as: Carora, Quibor, El Tocuyo, Cubiro, Cabudare and Duaca; which base the economy in agricultural activities.

Agricultural: Coffee and sugar cane, onions, corn, potatoes, sisal, sorghum and fruits.
Breeding: poultry, cattle, goats, sheep and pigs.
Fishing: catfish, bigheaded, permit,
Barquisimeto's rise among others

Industrial: Cement, food products, alcoholic and soft drinks, steel and metal products, tools and equipment, ropes and bags, musical instruments
Craftsmanship: The existing variety of craftsmanship in the state of Lara is influenced by a past where the beliefs and idiosyncrasies of a people are mixed, without leaving aside the crossbreeding that has greatly enriched the practice and elaboration of the same. Three lines of craft production that stand out in the state. In the first place is the pottery, pieces and objects of daily use impregnated with artistic elements of great aesthetic value; secondly, the weaving; and finally the wood carving.

Livestock: Cattle, pigs, goats, sheep and poultry.
Agricultural Products: Potatoes, cambur, sisal, onions, tomatoes, grapes, sugar cane, caraotas, pineapple and coffee.
Forest Resources: Cují, naked Indian, jabillo, jobo, olive tree, semeruco and vera.
Mineral Resources: Refractory clays, silicic sands, limestone, iron, mercury, phyllites.

Lara, located in the commercial corridors that link the West, the Andes, the center and the east of the country, is an important receiver and distributor of foodstuffs to other regions inside and outside Venezuela (export) through the wholesale market that commercializes a third of the fresh food consumed in the country, Mercabar.

Considered since 1950 to be one of the Venezuelan cities least dependent on oil, agriculture and trade are the main economic activities in the region that contributes: 22% of coffee, 26% of sugar cane, 90% of pineapple, 31% of grapes, 54% of onions, 12% of tomatoes, 54% of paprika, 29% of cabbage, 100% of sisal and 22% of potatoes.

However, today only around 25 thousand hectares are irrigated due to the lack of water, which could change radically with the completion of the Yacambú hydraulic project and the hydraulic works for the Urdaneta and Torres municipalities, infrastructures that would provide around 60 hectares of arable land in the central north of the state.

From the industrial point of view, in the state of Lara this type of activity is concentrated in the city of Barquisimeto, which has industrial zones of important magnitude and production capacity.

Important administrative and public service activities are concentrated in the state metropolis of Barquisimeto, together with all kinds of commerce, banking and financial entities, due to its strategic location on the road network in the West of the country, and with its railway connection to Puerto Cabello and Acarigua. Equally important are the position as the hub of transport and storage companies. In addition, there are metal-mechanic, agri-industrial and textile industrial establishments, both in the city and in its immediate surroundings, such as cement plants, sugar mills, milk processing plants and others.

Agriculture
Of special relevance are the agricultural activities, especially the cultivation of sugar cane in the valleys of the rivers Tocuyo, Turbio and various regions; of specialized horticulture of onions, peppers and tomatoes in Quibor; of viticulture in Carora and El Tocuyo; of sisal and coconutcommerce between the central and western parts of Venezuela. It also serves as the centre of a large agricultural area that produces sisal, cacao, cattle, sugarcane, and coffee, as well as subsistence crops, along with pineapple, in the dry areas. In the highlands, coffee, potatoes and vegetables thrive. Important are the cattle activities, as much of the modern milk cattle ranch, like of the traditional cattle ranch of goats. Various types of tourism are taking on increasing significance, with emphasis on the expansion of the rich Larense craftsmanship in places like Guadalupe and Tintorero.

Natural resources
The state has metallic and non-metallic minerals, especially red and white clays, silica sands, gravels, iron, mercury, pyrrhophyllites, and various types of limestone. Among the forest resources are cuji, jabillo, jobo, olive, vera and semeruco.

The rivers, reservoirs and thermal water sources such as the dams of Dos Cerritos, Yacambú, Atarigua, Arenales, and the San Miguel Volcano provide hydraulic and geothermal potential.

Tourism

National Parks
In the territory of Lara State there are 5 national parks:

Yacambú National Park: It has 146 square kilometers and was created in 1962 to protect part of the Yacambú River basin.
Cerro Saroche National Park: With 320 square kilometers, it was established in December 1989 in the municipalities of Torres, Jiménez and Iribarren.
Terepaima National Park: It has 189 square kilometers and was created in April 1976 to protect the fauna and flora around the Sarare River and Fila Terepaima
Dinira National Park: It covers an area of 453.28 square kilometers created in 1988 to protect the upper basin of the Tocuyo River.
El Guache National Park: It covers 122 square kilometers and was created in 1993 to protect the upper basins of the Guache, Ospino and other nearby rivers.

Historical sites

Monument to Los Horcones: On July 22, 1813, one of the battles undertaken by the liberator Simón Bolívar took place, in it Major General Jacinto Lara also participated, but the one who is covered with glory in that battle is General Florencio Jiménez, accompanied by his partner José Félix Ribas.
Ateneo de Barquisimeto: It was created under the principle of rescuing the culture of the city, on October 8, 1986.
The Obelisk: Without a doubt, it is the most representative icon of the state of Lara. It is located to the west of the city of Barquisimeto (capital of the state) which was built in the year 1952, on the occasion of the 400 years of its foundation. The structure is based mainly on concrete and steel, has an elevator and measures 75 meters high. Although it is not an obelisk, that is what the citizens of Barquisimeto call it.

Teatro Juares: Located in the entire centre of the city of Barquisimeto, the Municipal Theatre was inaugurated in 1905. With more than 100 years, it has undergone several reforms, and has become a cultural icon for the city, where shows and cultural events are held, which is also attractive to tourists.
Ayacucho Park: Park built under the regime of General Gomez, has an area of four (4) hectares and a monument to Marshal Antonio Jose de Sucre, was the first park in Latin America with access for cars.
Carora's historical center: in this one there are old houses belonging to the founding families of the city, the Cathedral San Juan Bautista, the church El Calvario, the walk the heroes, among others.

Museums
Larense History Museum: Contains archaeological objects belonging to the culture that settled near Quibor, in addition to paintings, mummies and private collections. It is located in a large colonial house in front of the old cathedral of Barquisimeto.
La Salle Museum: It contains samples of archeology, paleontology and natural sciences. Among them are funerary pieces, ceramics and objects from the first cultures existing in Venezuelan territory. There are several mega-materials, one of which is larger than the one on display in Paris. There are also ammonites from the secondary period, mastodon tusks, molars of antediluvian animals, as well as marine fossils and a great variety of embalmed animals. Located in La Salle School in Barquisimeto

Anthropological Museum: It has a large number of fossilized skeletons dating from about two thousand years BC, as well as ceramics, necklaces, earrings (made from seashells), arrowheads, musical instruments, anthropomorphic and zoomorphic figures, all pieces of great historical value. The skeletons of pygmies range in size from 1.46 m to 1.50 m, with men standing out because they are taller than women, although both are characterized by deformed skulls due to flattening or elongation of the back. It is located on the Boulevard de Quíbor.
Colonial Museum: Founded on the four hundredth anniversary of the city. It keeps precious colonial relics and a great amount of documents and costumes from different periods. It is located in the Tocuyo.
Doña Emilia Rosa de Gil Tourist Center: It contains several crystalline ceramic items from the colonial period, a yellow skeleton, cultural vestiges found in Siquisique, shackles used in the time of the dictator Gomez and a variety of objects of great importance to the town.
Casa Lara (Carora): Here was born the general Juan Jacinto Lara, the hero of the Independence to whom the name of the State is due.
Museum of Barquisimeto: Building constructed in 1579, where previously the Hospital San Lázaro worked to pass after some reforms in the year of 1877 to be the Hospital La Caridad. Some time later, in 1939, it was renamed Antonio María Pineda Hospital. When this hospital was moved to another location, the building became the main museum of the city in 1983.

Main churches
Church of the Conception: First Cathedral built in Barquisimeto Dragged away by the earthquake of 1812, rebuilt 30 years later with a different style San Francisco Church: Built in 1865, it worked as the second cathedral.
Our Lady of the Conception Church This beautiful building is the only remaining vestige of the old colonial capital. The image of the Immaculate that is in the church was sent to El Tocuyo by Felipe II in 1547, and since then the altarpiece has not left the church.
Santuario Divina Pastora: Construction of the eighteenth century, has the image of the Divine Shepherdess, patron saint of Santa Rosa and Barquisimeto. In the month of January the image is taken in procession to the Cathedral of Barquisimeto. This procession is the second most important in Latin America.

Apart from the churches, the monument with the mantle of Mary stands out, which was built to honor the Virgin Mary in her dedication to the Divina Pastora.

Heraldry

Created by Decree of the Legislative Assembly, dated February 9, 1877.

The heraldic conformation of this emblem according to the ratification of the President of the State, Dr. Rafael González Pacheco, on May 8, 1905, is the following

"The Shield, divided into four quarters, two in gold and two in blue, in which the breeding is represented by two ox heads; a sickle and a bundle of ears representing agriculture. These quarters will be separated by a red bar, which will contain two cannons, and in the center, a fortress on a silver field. At the top, the Star of the West will shine and the whole shield will be encircled by a laurel wreath with a silver band.

Culture

The Culture of the region is very rich, it is a seat for multitudinous celebrations, such as The International Carnivals of Barquisimeto (Month of February–March), where you can see a great variety of floats, and artistic musical shows of recognized trajectory, The International Fair of Barquisimeto which begins on September 14 (anniversary of the founding of Barquisimeto), and culminates on September 25 each year, where you can see, among many things, various exhibitions and musical shows, and finally, a wide range of options to enjoy Christmas in Barquisimeto, where you can see various exhibitions, musical shows and many fireworks. It is customary to receive the New Year at La Flor de Venezuela, with family and friends. Around Barquisimeto and due to migration also in the city are practiced "Los Tamunangues" or devotional festivities to San Antonio de Padua, as payment of promises to favors received. The festivity has its origins in the Andes Larenses (Sanare-El Tocuyo) and is celebrated every June 13; but a Tamunangue can be held at any time of the year. Master Luis Felipe Ramón y Rivera explains that the name Tamunangue derives from the name given to the drum used in the interpretation of the characteristic songs of this dance, the tamunango.

The Divine Shepherdess is an important religious icon in Venezuela. She is the spiritual patron of the city and is one of the Marian invocations with many followers in the region. Every January 14 a multitudinous procession is held in which this image is carried from Santa Rosa to the Cathedral of Barquisimeto. More than two and a half million people have been counted,29 which would make it the second most important Marian procession in the world.

Traditions

In the state of Lara, different and varied cultural manifestations of folklore are mixed, which clearly enrich the society of the central-western part of the country. These festivals are celebrated throughout the year in the different municipalities that make up our state. Likewise, some of these typical folkloric manifestations that you can know are

The Tamunangue
The Blow
The Game of
Zaragozas
St. Benedict's Dance
Rosary of Souls
Turas

Sport

Lara State is home to several soccer, baseball, and basketball teams among other sports. In football highlights the Deportivo Lara based in the Metropolitan Stadium one of the most modern sports facilities in this region of the country, in baseball you can mention the Cardinals of Lara based in the historic Antonio Herrera Gutierrez Stadium, while in Basketball the most important team is Guaros de Lara based in the Domo Bolivariano.

Sports facilities
Farid Richa Stadium
Lara Metropolitan Stadium
Máximo Viloria Sports Centre
Antonio Herrera Gutierrez Stadium
Farid Richa Stadium
Bolivarian Dome of Barquisimeto

See also 
 States of Venezuela

References

External links 

 LaraTurismo, webguide of tourism in Lara
 

 
States of Venezuela
States and territories established in 1901